Chris Billam-Smith (born 2 August 1990) is an English professional boxer who has held the Commonwealth cruiserweight title since 2019 and European cruiserweight title from 2021 until 2022.

Amateur career
After training on and off as a youngster, Smith began to take boxing seriously at the age of 16. During a career in which he compiled a record of 32–11 while representing Poole ABC, he fought in several ABA Championships, reaching the finals in 2013 and 2016; losing out to Jack Massey at 86 kg and Cheavon Clarke at 91 kg respectively.

Professional career
Smith made his professional debut on 16 September 2017 under the tutelage of Shane McGuigan, scoring a first-round technical knockout (TKO) victory over Russ Henshaw at the O2 Academy in Bournemouth, Dorset.

After compiling a record of 9–0 (8 KO), he faced fellow undefeated British prospect Richard Riakporhe (9–0, 8 KO) for the WBA Inter-Continental cruiserweight title on 20 July 2019 at the O2 Arena in London. The fight was televised live on Sky Sports Box Office as part of the undercard of Dillian Whyte vs. Oscar Rivas. Smith suffered his first professional defeat via split decision (SD) over ten rounds. Two judges scored the bout in favour of Riakporhe with 97–92 and 95–94, while the third scored it 96–93 to Smith.

On 23 November 2019, he fought Craig Glover at the M&S Bank Arena (formerly Echo Arena), Liverpool, with the vacant Commonwealth cruiserweight title on the line. The fight was televised live on Sky Sports in the UK and streamed live on DAZN in the US as part of the undercard for Callum Smith's world title defence against John Ryder. The first-round saw both fighters engage at close-quarters, with Glover suffering a cut above his left eye in the first minute of the bout from an accidental clash of heads. In the second-round, Smith stayed at range behind the jab, landing hooks and straight right hands to bloody Glover's nose. Round three was much of the same, with Smith landing counter hooks as Glover tried to work on the inside. Glover had more success in the fourth, with both fighters landing solid jabs and hooks to the head. In the final 10 seconds of the round, Smith hurt Glover with a straight right hand and followed up with a four punch combination culminating with a left hook which dropped Glover to the canvas seconds before the bell sounding. Less than a minute into the fifth, Smith began to land a variety of heavy punches to the head of Glover, scoring a second knockdown with a powerful left hook to the jaw. Glover was able to get back to his feet before the referee's count of ten only to be met by more heavy shots from Smith, who landed two straight right hands to the side of Glover's head which promoted referee Mark Lyson to call a halt to the contest as Glover was knocked down for a third time, handing Billam-Smith the Commonwealth title via fifth-round TKO.

He made the first defence of his Commonwealth title on 7 August 2020, facing Nathan Thorley at the Matchroom Sport headquarters in Brentwood, Essex, live on Sky Sports as part of the undercard for Terri Harper's world title defence against Natasha Jonas. Following a fast start from Smith, he scored a knockdown at the end of the first round after three left hooks forced Thorley to go down on one knee. After trapping Thorley in a corner in the second round, Smith landed a series of right hands to send Thorley to the canvas for a second time. Smith scored a third knockdown with another right hand, with Thorley again making it back to his feet only to see referee Mark Lyson call a halt to the contest, handing Smith a second-round TKO victory to retain his Commonwealth title.

On 31 July 2021, Billam-Smith faced Tommy McCarthy as part of Matchroom's Fight Camp in a bout where the British, European and Commonwealth cruiserweight titles were at stake. In a very competitive bout, Billam-Smith prevailed by split decision, with scores of 116-112 and 115-114 in his favour, and 115-114 in favour of McCarthy. Billam-Smith made his first European title defense against Dylan Bregeon on 13 November 2021, at the Sheffield Arena in Sheffield, England. He won the fight by unanimous decision, with scores of 120-109, 119-109 and 119-109.

Billam-Smith fought a rematch with Tommy McCarthy on April 16, 2022, on the undercard of the Conor Benn and Chris van Heerden welterweight bout. He won the fight by a eight-round technical knockout, flooring McCarthy with a right cross.

Billiam-Smith defeated Isaac Chamberlain to retain his Commonwealth and European cruiserweight titles, winning on three scorecards of 117-111. Billiam-Smith vacated the EBU Cruiserweight title in July 2022.

Professional boxing record

References

Living people
1990 births
Sportspeople from Bournemouth
English male boxers
Commonwealth Boxing Council champions
Cruiserweight boxers